The North Western Hotel in Morecambe, Lancashire, England, was built in 1847–48.  It was designed by the Lancaster architects Paley and Austin for the "Little" North Western Railway.  Including furnishings, it cost £4,795.  It was a two-storey building containing 40 bedrooms.  In 1871, when the railway became part of the Midland Railway, its name was changed to the Midland Hotel.  It was demolished and replaced by a new hotel, also called the Midland Hotel, in 1932.

References

Hotel buildings completed in 1848
Morecambe, North Western Hotel
Railway hotels in England
Defunct hotels in England
Buildings and structures in Morecambe
Hotels in Lancashire
History of Lancaster
Demolished buildings and structures in England
Demolished hotels in the United Kingdom
Buildings and structures demolished in 1932